The 2015–16 NHL Three Star Awards are the way the National Hockey League denotes its players of the week and players of the month of the 2015–16 season.

Weekly

Monthly

Rookie of the Month

See also
Three stars (ice hockey)
2015–16 NHL season
2015–16 NHL suspensions and fines
2015–16 NHL transactions
2015 NHL Entry Draft
2015 in sports
2016 in sports
2013–14 NHL Three Star Awards

References

Three Star Awards
Lists of NHL Three Star Awards